Chatur Singh Two Star is a 2011 Indian Hindi-language action comedy film directed by Ajay Chandhok, starring Sanjay Dutt, Ameesha Patel and Suresh Menon in the lead roles. Produced by Mohammad Aslam and Parag Sanghvi. It was released on 19 August 2011. The film is based on the novel Chalaak Jasoos and the 2006 Hollywood film, The Pink Panther.

The film was a critical and commercial failure as it received negative reception from both critics and cinema-goers.

Plot
Bumbling cop Chatur Singh (Sanjay Dutt) is sent on a special mission to South Africa to solve a high-profile case involving the murder of a politician and a cache of diamonds. But before he can redeem his botched-up career he must deal with a bunch of loonies which includes a crazy mafia don (Satish Kaushik), a weird taxi driver (Sanjay Mishra), a hysterical boss (Anupam Kher), and a pretty damsel in distress (Ameesha Patel).

Cast
 Sanjay Dutt as Chatur Singh 2 Star / James Armani
 Ameesha Patel as Sonia Varma
 Suresh Menon as Purushutam Singh (Pappu Panther)
 Anupam Kher as Commissioner Rajpal Sinha / Dr Jhatka
 Vishwajeet Pradhan as DGP Kulkarni
 Satish Kaushik as Gullu Gulfam
 Shakti Kapoor as Don Chihuhua
 Gulshan Grover as Agriculture Minister Y.Y. Singh
 Sanjay Mishra as Lallan Kupleri
 Murli Sharma as Tony
 Rati Agnihotri as Savitri Y. Singh
 Indira Krishnan as Sonia's Sister
 Ganesh Yadav as Inspector Yadav

Production
The film was announced in late 2007 with Sanjay Dutt cast for the role of Chatur Singh. During June 2008, filming began in India and the following schedule was filmed in Cape Town, South Africa during July and August in the same year. In 2009, some of the remaining portions were completed and the film moved to its post-production stage in early 2010.

The theatrical trailer of the film was released on 21 July 2011 online and also in cinemas with Singham (2011).

Reception

Critical
Most critics were dismissive. Vandana Krishnan of Behindwoods rated it as 0.5 out of 5 and said "Chathur Singh 2 star is not even worth half a star." Rajeev Masand of CNN-IBN gave it one star out of five saying that it is "Strictly avoidable. Unless you're one for self-punishment." Saibal Chatterjee of NDTV gave it zero stars and said "This is a film that proffers madness without the slightest semblance of method. It's just as well that there are two stars in its title. It doesn't deserve any." Shubhra Gupta of The Indian Express gave the film one star concluding "There is no story in 'Chatur Singh, Two Star’. And the only story to 'Chatur Singh, Two Star’ seems to one of delusion : that the people involved in it, were making a film." Taran Adarsh of Bollywood Hungama awarded one and a half stars saying "Chatur Singh Two Star tries hard to make you laugh, but fails in its endeavour." Rediff.com gave it zero stars, too. Nupur Barua of fullhyd.com called it a sorry excuse of a movie, warning "you may get suicidal at the end of it".

Box office
Chatur Singh Two Star earned 30 million in its full theatrical run. The film grossed 130 million worldwide. It was declared a flop.

Soundtrack

The film's soundtrack is composed by Sajid–Wajid with lyrics penned by Jalees Sherwani, Shabbir Ahmed, Junaid Wasi, Asif Ali Baig. The soundtrack was released to YouTube's official channel on 29 July 2011.

Track listing

References

External links
 
 

2010s Hindi-language films
Indian action comedy films
2011 films
Indian detective films
2011 action comedy films